The 1925 Detroit Stars baseball team competed in the Negro National League during the 1925 baseball season. The team compiled a 56–44 record in games against National League opponents. The Stars played their home games at Mack Park located on the east side of Detroit, about four miles from downtown, at the southeast corner of Fairview Ave. and Mack Ave. The team was owned by John A. Roesink and managed on the field by catcher-manager Bruce Petway.

Batting
The Stars led the Negro National League with 628 runs scored and ranked second to the Kansas City Monarchs with a team batting average of .288.

Center fielder Turkey Stearnes was the team's batting star. He led the Negro National Leaghe in hits (135), home runs (19), RBIs (126), and slugging percentage (.668). He also finished second in batting average (.371), one point behind Wilson Redus, and second in runs scored (93), one run behind Cool Papa Bell. Stearnes died in 1979 and was posthumously inducted into the Baseball Hall of Fame in 2000.

Other key position players for the 1919 Stars included:
 First baseman Edgar Wesley - Wesley compiled a .404 batting average and .715 slugging percentage with 17 home runs and 73 RBIs in 60 games.
 Right fielder Clarence Smith - Smith compiled a .344 batting average and .501 slugging percentage with 10 triples, 84 runs scored, 82 RBIs in 92 games.
 Third baseman Ray Sheppard - Sheppard compiled a .339 batting average and .486 slugging percentage in 52 games.

Pitching
Pitching was the team's weakness. The Stars ranked last in the Negro National League with 562 runs allowed and fifth out of eight teams with an earned run average (ERA) of 5.74.

The bright spot in the pitching staff was Andy Cooper, a left-hander from Texas. Cooper appeared in 30 games (13 as a starter) and compiled a 12-2 win–loss record with a 2.88 ERA and 49 strikeouts. He ranked among the league's leaders in wins (second), winning percentage (second), and ERA (third). Cooper died in 1941 and was posthumously inducted into the Baseball Hall of Fame in 2006.

Other pitchers included Harry Kenyon (8-6, 6.41 ERA, 60 strikeouts), and Lewis Hampton (6-1, 4.26 ERA, 29 strikeouts).

Roster

Game log

References

1925 in sports in Michigan
Negro league baseball seasons
African-American history in Detroit